Sussan Babaie (born 1954) is an Iranian-born art historian and curator. She is best known for her work on Persian art and Islamic art of the early modern period. She has written extensively on the art and architecture of the Safavid dynasty. Her research takes a multidisciplinary approach and explores topics such as urbanism, empire studies, transcultural visuality and notions of exoticism. In her work as a curator, Babaie has worked on exhibitions at the Sackler Museum of Harvard University (2010), the University of Michigan Museum of Art (installation, 2002–2006), and the Smith College Museum of Art (1998).

She lived in the United States from 1979 until 2013. Since 2013, Babaie has been the Dr Andrew W. Mellon Reader in the Arts of Iran and Islam at The Courtauld Institute of Art in London.

Biography 
 
Babaie was born in Abadan, Iran, in 1954. She studied graphic design at the Faculty of Fine Arts at the University of Tehran with Iranian graphic designer Morteza Momayyez until the Iranian Revolution of 1979, when she moved to the United States. In the US, Babaie continued her studies at the American University in Washington DC, where she gained an MA in Italian Renaissance and American Arts after switching her focus to art history. In 1994 she completed her PhD at New York University Institute of Fine Arts under Priscilla P. Soucek. Her dissertation focused on the arts and architecture of Iran, and was titled "Safavid Palaces at Isfahan; Continuity and Change (1590–1666)".

Since the 1990s, Babaie has taught art history in Europe and the US. She was an assistant professor in the Department of the History of Art at the University of Michigan between 2001 and 2008 and a visiting professor at the Institut für Kunstgeschichte at Ludwig-Maximilian-University in Munich between 2010 and 2012. In 2013 she took up a newly established research post in Asian art history at the Courtauld Institute of Art, which is designed to focus on the period 1000-1750 AD and questions of imperialism and artistic patronage from the perspective of non-Western empires. It marked a change in approach for the Courtauld Institute of Art, where since the Second World War the curriculum has focused primarily on the Western tradition.

Sussan Babaie is on the editorial board of the journal Muqarnas and the president of the Historians of Islamic Art Association (2017–19). Babaie is also a member of the Governing Council of the British Academy's British Institute of Persian Studies, as well as a member of the Editorial and Advisory Boards of the Oxford University's Journal of Islamic Material Culture, as well as the Journal of Iranian Studies.

Research

Babaie's research has been supported by the National Endowment for the Humanities, the Fulbright Program and the Getty Research Institute in Los Angeles. Babaie's Isfahan and its Palaces: Statecraft, Shi'ism and the Architecture of Conviviality in Early Modern Iran (2008) was the Winner of the Houshang Pourshariati Iranian Studies Book Award in 2009.

Books
 Persian Drawings in the Metropolitan Museum of Art with Marie Lukens Swietochowski (New York: Metropolitan Museum of Art, 1989) 
 Slaves of the Shah: New Elites of Safavid Iran co-edited and co-authored with Kathryn Babayan, Ina Baghdiantz and Massumeh Farhad) (London: I.B. Tauris, 2004) 
 Isfahan and its Palaces: Statecraft, Shi'ism and the Architecture of Conviviality in Early Modern Iran (Edinburgh: University of Edinburgh Press: 2008) 
 Shirin Neshat co-authored with Rebecca Hart and Nancy Princenthal) (Detroit Institute of Arts, 2013) 
 Persian Kingship and Architecture: Strategies of Power in Iran from the Achaemenids to the Pahlavis co-edited with Talinn Grigor (I.B. Tauris, 2015) 
 The Mercantile Effect: On Art and Exchange in the Islamicate World during the 17th and 18th Centuries co-editor with Melanie Gibson (forthcoming; Chicago; University of Chicago Press, 2017)
 The Idea of Iran: post-Mongol polities and the Reinvention of Iranian Identities editor (forthcoming; London: I.B. Tauris, 2018–19)
 The Idea of Iran: Crisis and Renewal in the Age of Mongol Prestige editor (forthcoming; London: I.B. Tauris, 2018–19)

Exhibitions
 Persian Drawings in the Metropolitan Museum of Art co-curated with Marie Lukens Swietochowski. Metropolitan Museum of Art (1989)
 Islamic Art from the Permanent Collection Smith College Museum of Art (1998)
 Treasures of Islamic Art from UMMA Collections University of Michigan Museum of Art (2002-2006)
 Strolling in Isfahan guest curator Sackler Museum, Harvard University (2010)
 Eid al-Fitr: Breaking the Fast curator Calouste Gulbenkian Museum (2017)
 Noruz: Feasting in Spring curator Calouste Gulbenkian Museum (2017)

See also
 Arts of Iran
 Iranian Architecture
 Iranian Modern and Contemporary Art
 Women in the art history field

References

External links
 Sussan Babaie, the Courtauld Institute of Art
 The Islamic Golden Age: Islamic Architecture, 5 Feb 2014, BBC Radio programme.
 Historians of Islamic Art Association.

1954 births
Living people
Academics of the Courtauld Institute of Art
American University alumni
University of Tehran alumni
University of Michigan faculty
People from Abadan, Iran
Exiles of the Iranian Revolution in the United States
American people of Iranian descent
20th-century Iranian people
21st-century Iranian people
20th-century American women
21st-century American people
Historians of Islamic art
American curators
American non-fiction writers
New York University Institute of Fine Arts alumni
Iranian Iranologists
Iranian art historians